The Bassian thrush (Zoothera lunulata), also known as the olive-tailed thrush, is a medium-sized mostly insectivorous thrush found from northern Queensland to southeastern Australia; it also occurs in Tasmania, on some larger islands of Bass Strait, and on Kangaroo Island.

It is estimated that the rangewide population is large, though no official count has ever been established.

The Bassian thrush lives in shrubland, forests, and rainforests. It appears to be a resident species, but there is some evidence that some individuals have nomadic tendencies, usually in the non-breeding season. Though affected by human destruction of its natural habitats, its range is so large that the impact is negligible.

The thrush ranges in color from brown to an olive color, with a white ring around its eyes and black bars on its back, rear, and head. Its underbody is paler, with dark scalloping, and its wings have a dark bar running the length of the underside.

Nesting begins in the winter months (from late June) and continues till the end of summer. The two or three eggs which form a clutch vary from pale green or blue to light stone. The cup-shaped nest is usually built of strips of bark, at times mixed with leaves, and is lined with grasses and rootlets. Sites vary from a few feet to 50 feet from ground. A fork in the tree is usually favoured, but the nest may be placed on the stump, or a ledge in a cave.  

Bassian thrushes are known to dislodge their prey out of piles of leaves by disturbing the leaf litter. The birds move quietly and often pause to listen for the movements of the insects.

Gallery

References

Bassian thrush
Birds of New South Wales
Birds of Queensland
Birds of South Australia
Birds of Tasmania
Birds of Victoria (Australia)
Endemic birds of Australia
Bassian thrush